Georges J. M. Meekers (born 1965 in Sint-Truiden, Belgium) is a wine writer and educator based in Malta.

His writing career began in the 1990s, when he wrote a wine column for Malta Today. He continues to contribute to The Times of Malta and several international wine trade magazines, such as Harpers Magazine, with vintage reports on Malta and other upcoming wine regions. He is also the author of the first reference book on the Maltese wine industry.

Outside Malta, Meekers is perhaps best known for his role as founder of the wine academy specialising in online wine tuition Wine Campus; he is also head of sales at the winery Emmanuel Delicata Winemaker, and is a member of the Circle of Wine Writers (UK).

Awards
His publication 'Wines of Malta – the essential guide' was awarded 'Best Wine Guide' at the Gourmand World Cookbook Award in London, 2008.

Selected bibliography
Georges Meekers, Wines of Malta – The Essential Guide, 2007
Georges Meekers, Georges Meekers' Cleanskin - A Vinous Expose, 2011
Georges Meekers, Wines of Malta, The Definitive Guide to the New Heritage Wines of Malta and Gozo, 2011 |e-book|

External links
Georges Meekers' official wine writer site

See also
List of wine personalities

Notes

1965 births
Living people
Wine critics
Vrije Universiteit Brussel alumni